Shaun Andrew Stonerook (born August 19, 1977) is a retired Italian-American professional basketball player. At a height of 2.01 m (6'7") tall, he played mainly at the power forward position, but he could also play as a small forward, if needed.

High school
Stonerook played high school basketball at Westerville North High School, in Westerville, Ohio.

College career
Stonerook played college basketball at Ohio State University, with the Ohio State Buckeyes, from 1995 to 1997. He then played college basketball at Ohio University with the Ohio Bobcats, from 1997 to 2000. With the Ohio Bobcats, he was named to the 1998–99 All-MAC Second Team, and to the 1999–00 All-MAC First Team.

Professional career
Stonerook began his pro career in Belgium, during the 2000–01 season, with the Belgian League club Racing Basket Antwerpen. He then moved to the Italian League club Cantù the next season. In 2004, he joined the Italian club Mens Sana Basket Siena.

He announced his retirement from his basketball playing career on August 14, 2012.

Awards and accomplishments

Pro career
Belgian League All-Star: (2001)
6× Italian Supercup Winner: (2003, 2007, 2008, 2009, 2010, 2011)
6× Italian League Champion: (2007, 2008, 2009, 2010, 2011, 2012)
Italian SuperCup MVP: (2007)
4× Italian Cup Winner: (2009, 2010, 2011, 2012)
2× Italian Cup MVP: (2009, 2010)

External links
 Euroleague.net Profile
 Italian League Profile 
 Eurobasket.com Profile

1977 births
Living people
American expatriate basketball people in Belgium
American expatriate basketball people in Italy
American men's basketball players
Antwerp Giants players
Basketball players from Columbus, Ohio
Italian men's basketball players
Italian people of American descent
Mens Sana Basket players
Ohio Bobcats men's basketball players
Ohio State Buckeyes men's basketball players
Pallacanestro Cantù players
Power forwards (basketball)
Small forwards